Kenneth Garrity (6 August 1935 – May 2016) was an English professional footballer who played as a forward or full back in the Football League for Accrington Stanley. He also played non-league football for clubs including Chorley and Darwen.

References

1935 births
2016 deaths
Footballers from Blackburn
English footballers
Association football forwards
Accrington Stanley F.C. (1891) players
Chorley F.C. players
Darwen F.C. players
English Football League players